Batken is a district of Batken Region in south-western Kyrgyzstan. The administrative seat lies at the city Batken, itself not part of the district.

Population

Populated places
In total, Batken District includes 47 settlements in 9 rural communities. Each rural community can consist of one or several villages. The rural communities and settlements in the Batken District are:

 Ak-Say (seat: Ak-Say; incl. Kök-Tash, Üch-Döbö, Kapchygay, Tashtumshuk and Ming-Bulak)
 Ak-Tatyr (seat: Ak-Tatyr; incl. Ravat and Govsuvar (Orto-Boz))
 Darya (seat: Chek; incl. Jangyryk, Tunuk-Suu, Kan, Tabylgy, Kayyngdy, Sary-Talaa, Korgon-Tash and Jangy-Jer)
 Kara-Bak (seat: Kara-Bak; incl. Dostuk, Kyzyl-Bel, Chet-Kyzyl, Zardaly, Dobo and Bay Kara-Bak)
 Kara-Bulak (seat: Bujum; incl. Kara-Bulak)
 Kyshtut (seat: Tayan; incl. Gaz, Kyshtut, Say, Sogment and Charbak)
 Samarkandek (seat: Samarkandek; incl. Jangy-Bak, Pasky-Aryk and Ming-Örük)
 Suu-Bashy (seat: Boz-Adyr; incl. Apkan, Böjöy, Kara-Tokoy and Aygül-Tash)
 Tört-Kül (seat: Chong-Talaa; incl. Ak-Ötök, Ak-Turpak, Zar-Tash and Chongara)

References 

Districts of Batken Region